Gaithersburg, officially the City of Gaithersburg, is a city in Montgomery County, Maryland, United States. At the time of the 2020 U.S. Census, Gaithersburg had a population of 69,657, making it the ninth-largest location in the state. Gaithersburg is located to the northwest of Washington, and is considered a suburb and a primary city within the Washington–Arlington–Alexandria, DC–VA–MD–WV Metropolitan Statistical Area. Gaithersburg was incorporated as a town in 1878 and as a city in 1968.

Gaithersburg is located east and west of Interstate 270. The eastern section includes the historic area of the town. Landmarks and buildings from that time can still be seen in many places but especially in the historic central business district of Gaithersburg called "Olde Towne". The east side also includes Lakeforest Mall, City Hall, and the Montgomery County Fair grounds, and Bohrer Park (a well-known joint community recreation center and outdoor water park for kids and families). The west side of the city has many wealthier neighborhoods that were designed with smart growth techniques and embrace New Urbanism. These include the Kentlands community, the Lakelands community, and the Washingtonian Center (better known as Rio), a shopping/business district. Consumers often come to this area during Black Friday and other shopping holidays for the deals and variety of huge brand name stores like Target and Dick's Sporting Goods, and smaller stores like Francesca's and Blue Mercury. Two New Urbanism communities are under construction, including Watkins Mill Town Center (Casey East and West), and the massive "Science City". The state has a bus rapid transit line, Corridor Cities Transitway or "CCT", planned for the western portion of the city starting at Shady Grove Metro Station and connecting all the high density western Gaithersburg neighborhoods with a total of eight stops planned in the city.

The National Institute of Standards and Technology (NIST) is headquartered in Gaithersburg directly west of I-270. Other major employers in the city include IBM, Lockheed Martin Information Systems and Global Services business area headquarters, AstraZeneca, and the French multinational corporation, Sodexo. Gaithersburg is also the location of the garrison of the United States Army Reserve Legal Command.

Gaithersburg is noted for its ethnic and economic diversity; it was ranked second for ethnic diversity among the 501 largest U.S. cities, and first among smaller U.S. cities, by WalletHub in 2021.

History

Gaithersburg was settled in 1765 as a small agricultural settlement known as Log Town near the present day Summit Hall on Ralph Crabb's 1725 land grant "Deer Park". The northern portion of the land grant was purchased by Henry Brookes, and he built his brick home "Montpelier" there, starting first with a log cabin in 1780/3. This 1,000-acre tract became part of the landmark IBM Headquarters complex built on the then-new I-270 Interstate "Industrial", now "Technology", Corridor in the late 1960s to the 1970s. Benjamin Gaither married Henry's daughter Margaret, and Benjamin and Margaret inherited a portion of Henry's land prior to Henry's death in 1807. Gaither built his home on the land in 1802. By the 1850s the area had ceased to be called Log Town and was known to inhabitants as Gaithersburg.

19th century
The Forest Oak Post Office, named for a large tree in the town, was located in Gaither's store in 1851.

On July 10 1864, using the route of present-day 355, over 10,000 Confederate troops camped overnight in the area, including the present Bohrer Park, after a one-day march from Frederick after the Battle of Monocacy. The next day the troops continued towards Washington in an unsuccessful attempt to take the city.

When the railroad was built through town in 1873, the new station was called Gaithersburg, an officially recognized name for the community for the first time.  Also in 1873 the B&O Railroad constructed a station at Gaithersburg, designed by Ephraim Francis Baldwin as part of his well-known series of Victorian stations in Maryland. Rapid growth occurred shortly thereafter, and on April 5, 1878, the town was officially incorporated as the Town of Gaithersburg.

Gaithersburg boomed during the late 19th century and churches, schools, a mill, grain elevators, stores, and hotels were built. Much of this development focused around the railroad station.

In 1899, Gaithersburg was selected as one of six global locations for the construction of an International Latitude Observatory as part of a project to measure the Earth's wobble on its polar axis. The Gaithersburg Latitude Observatory is (as of 2007) the only National Historic Landmark in the City of Gaithersburg. The observatory and five others in Japan, Italy, Russia, and the United States gathered information that is still used by scientists today, along with information from satellites, to determine polar motion; the size, shape, and physical properties of the earth; and to aid the space program through the precise navigational patterns of orbiting satellites. The Gaithersburg station operated until 1982 when computerization rendered the manual observation obsolete.

Late 20th century
In 1968, Gaithersburg was upgraded from a town to a city.

Gaithersburg remained a predominantly rural farm town until the 1970s when more construction began. As the population grew, with homes spreading throughout the area, Gaithersburg began taking on a suburban and semi-urban feel, leaving its farming roots behind. During the late 1990s and 2000s, it had become one of the most economically and ethnically diverse areas in the Washington, D.C. Metropolitan Area as well as the State of Maryland, with people from all walks of life calling Gaithersburg home. This can be seen in the local schools, with Gaithersburg High School and Watkins Mill High School having two of the most diverse student bodies in the region.

During a 1997 rainstorm, the 295-year-old forest oak tree that gave its name to the Forest Oak Post Office crashed down. The tree served as the inspiration for the city's logo, which is also featured prominently on the city's flag.

21st century
In 2007, parts of the film Body of Lies were filmed in the city, at a building on 100 Edison Park Drive. The film was released in 2008 and the building is now the Montgomery County Police Department's headquarters.

On July 16, 2010, Gaithersburg was part of the area where a 3.6 magnitude earthquake was felt, one of the strongest to occur in Maryland.

Geography

Demographics

2010 census
As of the census of 2010, there were 59,933 people, 22,000 households, and 14,548 families residing in the city. The racial makeup of the city was 31.9% non-Hispanic White, 16.3% African American, 0.5% Native American, 16.9% Asian (6.01 Chinese, 4.77% Indian, 2.03% Korean, 1.69% Filipino, 1.02% Vietnamese, 0.62% Burmese), 0.1% Pacific Islander, 10.7% from other races, and 4.8% from two or more races. Hispanic or Latino of any race were 24.2% of the population (8.3% Salvadoran, 2% Honduran, 1.9% Mexican, 1.9% Peruvian, 1.7% Guatemalan).

There were 22,000 households, of which 37.1% had children under the age of 18 living with them, 48.3% were married couples living together, 12.7% had a female householder with no husband present, 5.1% had a male householder with no wife present, and 33.9% were non-families. 26.7% of all households were made up of individuals, and 7.5% had someone living alone who was 65 years of age or older. The average household size was 2.70 and the average family size was 3.24.

The median age in the city was 35.1 years. 24.2% of residents were under the age of 18; 7.9% were between the ages of 18 and 24; 33.8% were from 25 to 44; 24.6% were from 45 to 64; and 9.5% were 65 years of age or older. The gender makeup of the city was 48.6% male and 51.4% females.

2000 census
As of the census of 2000, there were 52,613 people, 19,621 households, and 12,577 families residing in the city. The racial makeup of the city is 34.7% White, 19.5% Black or African American, 0.2% Native American, 13.9% Asian, 0.1% Pacific Islander, 3.6% from other races, and 3.2% from two or more races. 24.8% of the population were Hispanic or Latino of any race. 34.3% of Gaithersburg's population was foreign-born.

There were 19,621 households, out of which 34.8% had children under the age of 18 living with them, 48.6% were married couples living together, 11.2% had a female householder with no husband present, and 35.9% were non-families. 27.8% of all households were made up of individuals, and 7.2% had someone living alone who was 65 years of age or older. The average household size was 2.65 and the average family size was 3.14
the population was spread out, with 25.0% under the age of 18, 9.0% from 18 to 24, 37.7% from 25 to 44, 20.0% from 45 to 64, and 8.2% who were 65 years of age or older. The median age was 34 years. For every 100 females, there were 95.1 males. For every 100 females age 18 and over, there were 92.4 males.

Economy
According to the city's 2020 Comprehensive Annual Financial Report, the top employers in the city are:

Gaithersburg also receives significant income from its conference organization platform including prominent conferences such as the CHI 84 conference.

RIO Washingtonian Center a.k.a. rio a.k.a. Rio Lakefront, is a 760,000-square-foot complex of retail, restaurant and entertainment including AMC/Loews rio Cinemas, Target, LOFT, Barnes & Noble, Dave & Buster's, and Dick's Sporting Goods, built along an artificial lake.

Government

Gaithersburg has an elected, five-member City Council, which serves as the legislative body of the city. The mayor, who is also elected, serves as president of the council. The day-to-day administration of the city is overseen by a career city manager. Gaithersburg is also the location of the United States Army Reserve Legal Command.

The city's current mayor is Jud Ashman, who has held the office since 2014. On October 6, 2014, the Gaithersburg City Council selected city council member Jud Ashman to serve as mayor until the next City of Gaithersburg election in November 2015, replacing resigning mayor Sidney Katz. Ashman was re-elected in November 2015 and would be re-elected to full terms in 2017 and 2021.

Previous mayors include:

 George W. Meem 1898–1904
 Carson Ward 1904–1906
 John W. Walker 1906–1908
 E. D. Kingsley 1908–1912
 Richard H. Miles 1912–1918
 John W. Walker 1918–1924
 Walter M. Magruder 1924–1926
 William McBain 1926–1948
 Harry C. Perry, Sr. 1948–1954
 Merton F. Duvall 1954–1966
 John W. Griffith 1966–1967
 Harold C. Morris 1967–1974
 Susan E. Nicholson, May–September 1974
 Milton M. Walker 1974–1976
 B. Daniel Walder 1976–1978
 Bruce A. Goldensohn 1978–1986
 W. Edward Bohrer, Jr. 1986–1998
 Sidney A. Katz 1998 – 2014
 Jud Ashman, November 2014 – Present

The departments of the city of Gaithersburg and their directors include:
 Office of the City Manager, Tanisha R. Briley
 Finance and Administration, Kimberly Francisco
 Planning and Code Administration, John Schlichting
 Community and Public Relations, Britta Monaco
 Human Resources, Kimberly Yocklin
 Information Technology, Peter Cottrell
 Parks, Recreation, and Culture, Carolyn Muller
 Chief of Police, Mark Sroka
 Public Works, Anthony Berger

Education
The following Montgomery County Public Schools are located in Gaithersburg:

Elementary schools
 Brown Station
 Rachel Carson
 Darnestown
 Diamond
 DuFief
 Fields Road
 Flower Hill
 Gaithersburg
 Goshen
 Jones Lane
 Laytonsville
 Thurgood Marshall
 Judith A. Resnik
 Rosemont
 South Lake
 Stedwick
 Strawberry Knoll
 Summit Hall
 Washington Grove
 Watkins Mill
 Whetstone
 Woodfield

Middle schools
 Forest Oak 
 Gaithersburg 
 Lakelands Park 
 Ridgeview 
 Shady Grove

High schools
 Gaithersburg High School
 Quince Orchard High School
 Watkins Mill High School

Media

Gaithersburg is primarily served by the Washington, D.C. media market.

Newspapers
 The Town Courier newspaper is based in Kentlands and focuses on Gaithersburg's west side neighborhoods, in addition to publishing Rockville and Urbana editions.

Infrastructure

Police

Being a city, Gaithersburg also has its own police department, which was created in 1963.

Transportation

Roads and highways

The most prominent highways serving Gaithersburg are Interstate 270 and Interstate 370. I-270 is the main highway leading northwest out of metropolitan Washington, D.C., beginning at Interstate 495 (the Capital Beltway) and proceeding northwestward to Interstate 70 in Frederick. I-370 is a short spur, starting just west of I-270 in Gaithersburg and heading east to its junction with Maryland Route 200. Via MD 200, I-370 connects Gaithersburg with Interstate 95 near Laurel.

Maryland Route 355 was the precursor to I-270 and follows a parallel route. It now serves as the main commercial roadway through Gaithersburg and neighboring communities. Other state highways serving Gaithersburg include Maryland Route 117, Maryland Route 119 and Maryland Route 124. Maryland Route 28 passes just outside the Gaithersburg corporate limits.

Transit

Gaithersburg is connected to the Washington Metro via Shady Grove station, which is located just outside the city limits and is the north-western terminus of the Red Line.

The Corridor Cities Transitway is a proposed bus rapid transit line that would have 8 stops in Gaithersburg, generally in the western half of the city.

Maryland's MARC system operates commuter rail services connecting Gaithersburg to Washington, D.C. with two stations in the city, at Old Town Gaithersburg and Metropolitan Grove, and a third station — Washington Grove — just outside city limits.

Bus service in Gaithersburg consists of Metrobus routes operated by WMATA and Ride-On routes operated by Montgomery County, as well as paratransit service provided by MetroAccess.

Airport
Montgomery County Airpark is located 3 miles (5 km) northeast of the city.

Notable people

Sankar Adhya, member of the National Academy of Sciences
Utkarsh Ambudkar, actor, rapper
Lawson Aschenbach, NASCAR driver
 Georges C. Benjamin, former secretary of the Maryland Department of Health and Mental Hygiene
 Kimberly J. Brown, actress who starred in Halloweentown
 Mark Bryan, lead guitarist of Hootie & the Blowfish
 Isabel McNeill Carley, published music teacher, lived in Gaithersburg from 2004 until her death in 2011
 Justin Carter (born 1987), basketball player for Maccabi Kiryat Gat of the Israeli Premier League
 Kiran Chetry, CNN anchor
 Jeanine Cummins, author
 Dominique Dawes, three-time women's Olympic gymnastics team member, member of the Magnificent Seven
 Stefon Diggs, professional football player for the Buffalo Bills
 Trevon Diggs, professional football player for the Dallas Cowboys
 Brandon Victor Dixon, American actor, singer and theatrical producer
 Astrid Ellena, Miss Indonesia 2011
 Hank Fraley, former football player in the NFL
 Judah Friedlander, actor, most notably from the television show 30 Rock
 Jake Funk, professional football player for the Los Angeles Rams and Super Bowl LVI champion
 Joshua Harris, Author and former Christian pastor
 Kelela, R&B singer
 Matt Holt, former singer of Nothingface and Kingdom of Snakes
 Paul James, actor, most notably from the television show Greek
 Courtney Kupets, 2004 Olympic gymnast and three-time NCAA champion
 Tim Kurkjian, ESPN baseball analyst, appears on SportsCenter and Baseball Tonight, author of America's Game and Is This a Great Game, or What?: From A-Rod's Heart to Zim's Head—My 25 Years in Baseball
 Matthew Lesko, author of Free Money from the government books
 Sir Robert Bryson Hall II (entertainer) better known as Logic, hip hop musician, rapper, musical engineer
 Lucas and Marcus, dancers and YouTube personalities
 Shane McMahon, WWE wrestler and commissioner of WWE SmackDown Live 
 Jim Miklaszewski, chief Pentagon correspondent for NBC News
Malcolm Miller, basketball player and NBA champion for the Toronto Raptors
 John Papuchis, college football coach
 Andrew Platt, former Maryland House of Delegates member
 Guy Prather, football player
 Paul Rabil, lacrosse player (midfield), four-time All-American at Johns Hopkins University, all-star for the MLL's Boston Cannons, co-founder of the Premier Lacrosse League, current midfielder for the Atlas lacrosse club
 Chris Coghlan, Major League Baseball player
 Eddie Stubbs, country musician, disc jockey, and Grand Ole Opry announcer
 Jodie Turner-Smith, actress and model
 Wale, hip hop musician and rapper
 Jessica Watkins, NASA astronaut
 David P. Weber, principal in Gaithersburg and Washington, D.C.–based law firm Goodwin Weber LLC and former assistant inspector general for the U.S. Securities and Exchange Commission
 James White, professional basketball player who played for the San Antonio Spurs and Houston Rockets
 6ix, record producer
 Dwayne Haskins, NFL quarterback for the Pittsburgh Steelers
 Frederick Yeh, biologist and animal welfare activist

In popular culture
 Part of the 2006 film Borat was filmed in Gaithersburg in 2005.
 Part of an episode of Da Ali G Show was filmed in Gaithersburg in 2004.
 It is mentioned by character Fox Mulder in episodes of The X-Files and as a story location.

Notes

References

Further reading

External links

 
a photographic tour of the city's history

 
1802 establishments in Maryland
Cities in Maryland
Cities in Montgomery County, Maryland
Cities in the Baltimore–Washington metropolitan area
Populated places established in 1802
Washington metropolitan area